During the 1996–97 English football season, Plymouth Argyle F.C. competed in the Football League Second Division.

Season summary
In the 1996–97 season, Plymouth manager Warnock was sacked within a year as the club narrowly avoided being relegated back to the basement division. Warnock's assistant Mick Jones became his successor.

In February 1997, Plymouth participated in "The Battle of Saltergate" – in a 2–1 win at Chesterfield, a fight broke out in the 88th minute, involving all 20 outfield players. Chesterfield's Darren Carr and Kevin Davies and Plymouth's Tony James and Richard Logan were all sent-off. To make matters even worse, Argyle's Wembley hero Ronnie Mauge had already been sent-off in the 36th minute. It was the first time in Football League history that five players were sent off in one game.

Final league table

Results
Plymouth Argyle's score comes first

Legend

Football League Second Division

FA Cup

League Cup

Football League Trophy

Players

First-team squad
Squad at end of season

References

Notes

Plymouth Argyle F.C. seasons
Plymouth Argyle